The 2019–20 Old Dominion Monarchs men’s basketball team represented Old Dominion University in the 2019–20 NCAA Division I men's basketball season. The Monarchs, led by 7th-year head coach Jeff Jones, played their home games at Chartway Arena in Norfolk, Virginia as members of Conference USA.

Previous season
The Monarchs finished the 2018–19 season 26–9 overall, 13–5 in C-USA play to win the regular season championship. In the C-USA tournament, they defeated Louisiana Tech in the quarterfinals, UAB in the semifinals, to advance to the championship game, where they faced off against Western Kentucky, winning the game, earning the C-USA's automatic bid into the NCAA tournament. In the NCAA Tournament, they received the No. 14 seed in the South Region, where they were matched up against No. 3 seed Purdue, losing the game by a final score of 48–61.

Roster

Schedule and results

|-
!colspan=12 style=|Non-conference regular season

|-
!colspan=12 style=| Conference USA regular season

|-
!colspan=12 style=| Conference USA tournament
|-

|-

Source

Notes

References

Old Dominion Monarchs men's basketball seasons
Old Dominion Monarchs
Old Dominion Monarchs basketball
Old Dominion Monarchs basketball